Search and rescue in the United States involves a wide range of organizations that have search and rescue responsibilities.

In January 2008, the United States Department of Homeland Security (DHS) released the National Response Framework (NRF) which serves as the guiding document for a federal response during a national emergency.  In addition to the NRF there are 15 annexes relating to Emergency Support Functions (ESF) which includes other federal agencies that contain resources or expertise to support an emergency.  Search and Rescue is included as ESF-9 and divides SAR into four primary elements while assigning a federal agency with the lead role for each of the four elements.
 Structural Collapse-USAR: Department of Homeland Security Federal Emergency Management Agency
 Waterborne: United States Coast Guard, United States Coast Guard Auxiliary
 Inland-wilderness: United States Department of Interior, National Park Service
 Aeronautical: United States Air Force Rescue Coordination Center, Civil Air Patrol, United States Air Force Aerospace Rescue and Recovery Service, US Navy (secondary missions for helicopter squadrons)

In the U.S., SAR standards are developed primarily by ASTM International and the National Fire Protection Association (NFPA) which are then used by organizations such as the Mountain Rescue Association (MRA), the National Association of Search and Rescue (NASAR), and the NFPA to develop training that will meet or exceed those standards. Within ASTM International, most standards of relevance to SAR are developed by Committee F32 on Search and Rescue. Formed in 1988, the committee had 85 current members and jurisdiction of 38 approved standards.

National organizations

Explorer Search and Rescue
Mountain Rescue Association
National Association for Search and Rescue
National Association of Volunteer Search and Rescue Teams
United States Search And Rescue Task Force

State organizations

Alabama
Alabama Association of Rescue Squads
Alabama Search and Rescue
Red Mountain Search Dog Association
California
San Luis Obispo County Search and Rescue
Bay Area Search and Rescue Council
Marin County Sheriff's Office Search & Rescue
San Mateo County Search and Rescue
Long Beach Search & Rescue
San Diego Mountain Rescue Team
Montrose Search and Rescue Team
Altadena Mountain Rescue Team
Sierra Madre Search and Rescue Team
Antelope Valley Search and Rescue
Malibu Search and Rescue Team
Santa Clarita Valley Search and Rescue Team
San Dimas Mountain Rescue Team

Colorado
Arapahoe Rescue Patrol
Rampart Search and Rescue
Mesa County Search and Rescue

Florida
Brothers to the Rescue

Maryland
Maryland Department of Natural Resources Police

Michigan
 Michigan Search and Rescue
K-9 ONE Search and Rescue

Missouri
 Urban Search and Rescue Missouri Task Force 1

New Jersey
 Urban Search and Rescue New Jersey Task Force 1
 New Jersey Search and Rescue

New Mexico
 New Mexico Search and Rescue Council

New York
 Urban Search and Rescue New York Task Force 1 
 Westchester County Technical Rescue Team
 New York Search And Rescue - Serving the Lower Hudson Valley
 Long Island Search and Rescue - Primarily serving Suffolk and Nassau Counties
 New York State Federation of Search and Rescue Teams - Statewide listing of SAR teams
 Lower Adirondack Search and Rescue - Serving all of New York State - Primarily the Adirondack Region wilderness

North Carolina
NCCERT (North Carolina Canine Emergency Response Team)

Ohio
 Rapid Assistance to Community Emergencies - Search and Rescue

Oregon
Multnomah County Sheriff's Office Search and Rescue
North Oregon Regional Search and Rescue
Portland Mountain Rescue

Pennsylvania
 East Penn Search and Rescue

Virginia
Virginia benefits from a state-coordinated system of training and response under the Virginia Department of Emergency Management (VDEM).  Under Title 44 of the Code of Virginia, VDEM develops and maintains the Commonwealth of Virginia Emergency Operations Plan (COVEOP) that includes the ESF-9 Annex for Search and Rescue. Similar to the federal version of ESF-9 under the National Response Framework (NRF), VDEM divides SAR into four primary elements.  While VDEM functions as the lead for ESF-9, many agencies, departments, and volunteer organizations routinely responds to and supports SAR operations in the Commonwealth of Virginia.

Washington
Washington State Search and Rescue Volunteer Advisory Council
Jefferson County Search and Rescue
King County Search and Rescue Association
Seattle Mountain Rescue
Snohomish County Volunteer Search and Rescue
Spokane County Search and Rescue
Pierce County Search and Rescue Council
Washington Air Search and Rescue

Aeronautical
Search and rescue services for downed, missing, or overdue aircraft and Emergency Locator Transmitters (ELTs). Organizations include:
 Civil Air Patrol
 Virginia State Police, Aviation Division

Inland/Wilderness
For search and rescue of lost and missing persons in a wide variety of circumstances and environments, resources include:

 Amherst County Search and Rescue
 Appalachian Professional Tracking Group
 Appalachian Search and Rescue Conference
 Black Diamond Search and Rescue Council
 Blue and Gray Search and Rescue Dogs
 Blue Ridge Mountain Rescue Group
 DOGS-East Search and Rescue

 Greater Atlantic Rescue Dogs
 Jefferson County Search Dog Association
 K-9 Alert Search and Rescue
 Piedmont Search and Rescue
 Search and Rescue Dogs of Maryland
 Southwest Virginia Mountain Rescue Group
 Tidewater Search and Rescue

Maritime/Waterborne
Providing search and rescue for vessels in distress in coastal and inland waters, resources include:
 Virginia Department of Game and Inland Fisheries
 Virginia Marine Resources Commission
 United States Coast Guard
 Smith Point Volunteer Sea Rescue
 Eckerd College Search and Rescue

USAR/Disaster
To provide response in the event of collapsed structures and significant events, organizations include:
 Maryland Task Force 1
 Virginia Task Force 1
 Virginia Task Force 2

References

External links

National Association for Search and Rescue

Rescue
Emergency services in the United States